The 2017 ESF Women's Championship was an international European softball competition that was held in Bollate, Italy from 25 June to 1 July 2017.

Results

Group A

Group B

Group C

Group D

Medal Round

Final standings

References

Womens Softball European Championship
Women's Softball European Championship
Womens Softball European Championship
Softball competitions in Italy